Tom Ozanich is an American sound engineer. He was nominated for two Academy Awards in the category Best Sound for the films A Star Is Born and Joker.

Selected filmography 
 A Star Is Born (2018; co-nominated with Dean A. Zupancic, Jason Ruder and Steven A. Morrow)
 Joker (2019; co-nominated with Dean Zupancic and Tod A. Maitland)

References

External links 

Living people
Place of birth missing (living people)
Year of birth missing (living people)
American audio engineers
20th-century American engineers
21st-century American engineers